Zach Deputy is a multi-instrumentalist, conspiracy theorist and songwriter based in Savannah, Georgia and best known for his live looping shows. He describes his style as "island-infused drum n' bass gospel ninja soul."

Biography

Deputy has a diverse ethnic background, having Puerto Rican, Irish, African, British, French, and Cherokee heritage, which opens him to influence from Latin, Caribbean, and African music. Deputy's music is often about "the highs of life," and he has said that songwriting is a way to "take pictures of the things that I want to remind myself of 10 years from now."

Deputy began looping when his bass player couldn't make it to a show and Zach decided to use a delay pedal as a looping pedal rather than cancel the gig. When he plays live, he will loop and layer chord progressions, bass, beat boxing, drum sounds, vocals, and guitar. He performs with four microphones: a vocal synthesizer for choir sounds; one for high-hat, snare, and back-beat; one for main vocals, and one for vocal bass or bass drum. His looping shows are known for their variety. "There are so many different ways it can happen. I can loop my guitar first, go into drums or loop a vocal riff first or straight into beat boxing and loop it or just go acoustic. It's very free formed. Every show can be extremely different from another. I try to have little consistency when it comes to my show. I never want to get bored with myself."

Deputy spends most of the year touring and at one time averaged 300 shows a year. His performances are mostly one-man-band looping shows, but also include Zach Deputy Band shows and acoustic storyteller shows. He has played many large festivals such as Jam Cruise, Mountain Jam, High Sierra Music Festival, Gathering of the Vibes and All Good Music Festival.

Deputy's third album, Another Day (2011), departed from eclectic sound of his first two records into a soulful rhythm and blues, showcasing his talents as a songwriter. The album was recorded over 5 days at Mission Sound Recording in Brooklyn, New York, with Grammy-winning producer Scott Jacoby and released on Eusonia Records. Of the album, Deputy said, "I wanted to put down some of the songs that I just played when I was hanging out by myself, when I wasn't actually trying to entertain anybody. Some people say they don't understand and it's a whole new direction, but for me it's a not a whole new direction, it's just something I do."

Zach Deputy is an avid disc golf player. He is a Celebrity Ambassador for Innova Discs and his passion for the sport has been featured on CNN. In March 2013, he hosted the first annual Zach Deputy's Disc Jam, a music and disc golf festival in Live Oak, Florida.

On the morning of January 9, 2021, a screenshot of a Facebook post circulated showing singer-songwriter Zach Deputy among the Trump supporters who stormed the Capitol on January 6, 2021. The screenshot shows a comment posted by Deputy’s older brother Whitley, which contained a selfie of the two of them outside the Capitol building, with Deputy wearing a red “Make America Great Again” hat. Deputy has since responded to the photo with a video on his own Facebook page, in which he admitted that he attended the rally and explains why he did so. 

In his nearly 10-minute response video, Deputy explained that he believes in the thoroughly debunked theory that the election results that show President-elect Joe Biden as the winner were tampered with and are not legitimate, which led to his desire to go to the Capitol.

“It is my opinion that there was a lot–and I mean a lot–of evidence that would suggest that our vote was tampered with,” the singer-songwriter said. “That vote being fair is the foundation of what makes this country real and truthful.” 

“I went to Washington DC to stand by that to let my presence known, that a lot of people don’t believe that this election was fair, and it was rigged,” he continued. “The truth is going to come out.”

Deputy also criticized the reaction to his attendance. Early on in the video, he said, “If you support a candidate, you’re going to have people lying about you, going and creating defamation of character and trying to get you kicked out of all your jobs.” 

Later, after explaining his reasoning for going to D.C., Deputy doubled down on his critique of the response to his attendance. “Now, because I stood with the president and I put on his hat because I believe he was the true winner and I didn’t want to see this country go down a path where they’re cheating elections, people have started labeling me all kinds of stuff. ‘Racist,’ ‘bigot,’ you know, the normal ones. When they don’t agree with you, they just call you these things.” 

Deputy later distanced himself from those who ultimately stormed and defaced the Capitol. “I was there at the Capitol, but I am one-hundred percent against rioting against the police,” he said. “I was one hundred percent, then that day, against storming into the Capitol building. I didn’t even get to the steps of the Capitol building.” He went on to claim that “the vast majority” of those there on Wednesday shared his feelings against storming the Capitol and inciting riots.

Deputy then made a call for “unity” in the United States. “What I want for this country is I want unity, unity between all races, unity between all people. I want people to get along and think different,” he said. “We’re all different, we all have different opinions.” He then used this line of argument to again criticize those who condemned his attendance at the rally. “When you hear a different opinion and you just start yelling ‘racist,’ ‘bigot’… then you’re not open for any thought. If you have a valid standpoint… present it with love and kindness. And if people don’t take it in, dust off your feet and go to the next place, it’s okay.” 

Toward the end of the video, Deputy revealed that he doesn’t identify with either major political party. “My motivation for going down to Washington was to support my country, both the left and the right,” he said. “I’m not a Republican, I’m not a Democrat. I don’t believe in the two-winged-bird system; I think it’s a bunch of crap.”

He continued, “My motivation for what I’m doing is love. I’m doing it because I love my country and I love my family, and I want my daughter to grow up in a place that’s free. If we don’t have a transparent election, all that stuff’s gone.”

Discography
Out of the Water (2008)
Sunshine (2009)
Into The Morning (EP) (2011)
Another Day (2011)
Wash It in the Water (2016)

References

External links
 Entry in the Live Music Archive

Musicians from Georgia (U.S. state)
One-man bands
People from Bluffton, South Carolina
Living people
Year of birth missing (living people)